Murter-Kornati is a municipality in central Dalmatia, Croatia. It is named after the two settlements that it consists of; Murter, located on the eponymous island, which it shares with Tisno, and Kornati which consists of the eponymous archipelago.

Population
In the 2011 census, the population of the municipality was 2,044, the majority of whom were ethnic Croats with 97.65%.

The municipality consists of two settlements:

 Murter, population 2,025 and
 Kornati, population 19

Geography
The settlement of Murter spans the following areas:
 Hramina cove, where a marina has been built, protected from all winds, making it a safe shelter for yachts.
 Slanica cove, which features a sandy beach, as well as an auto camp and a hotel ("Colentum")
 The old part of the Murter, called "Selo" (the Village), located near the Raduč hill and closer to the island's interior.

Due to Murter residents' growing concentration on the sea, the newer part of Murter was built on the coast of Hramina.

References

Populated places in Šibenik-Knin County
Populated coastal places in Croatia
Municipalities of Croatia